Van der Duim is a Dutch surname. Notable people with the surname include:

Antal van der Duim (born 1987), Dutch tennis player
 (1908–1980), Dutch speed skater
Hilbert van der Duim (born 1957), Dutch speed skater

Dutch-language surnames